Mbodomo (Mbódɔ̀mɔ̀, Gbaya-Mbodomo) is a Gbaya language of Cameroon.

References

Gbaya languages
Languages of Cameroon